Samsun Çarşamba Airport  is a public airport in Samsun, Turkey. Opened in 1998, it is 23 km from Samsun. The airport consists of one terminal. Passengers board aircraft from ladder trucks on the tarmac. 

The passenger terminal of the airport covers an area of 4,725 m2 and has a parking lot for 246 cars. The airport terminal has a restaurant, a bar and multiple car rental agencies within it. There are two small seating galleries.

Airlines and destinations
The following airlines operate regular scheduled and charter flights at Samsun-Çarşamba Airport:

Traffic Statistics 

(*)Source: DHMI.gov.tr

Air traffic control
Air traffic controllers at the tower also control the nearby coastguard helicopters.

Public Transportation
The airport is serviced by taxis, dolmus, charter bus and the H2 bus line run by the Samsun Metropolitan Municipality. Interest has been announced regarding extending the Samsun Tram to the airport or developing a bus line to connect the tram to the airport.

Future expansion
Construction of a taxiway would remove landing delays due to previously landed aircraft taxiing back down the runway. However to do this land adjacent to the airport would need to be purchased.

References

External links

1998 establishments in Turkey
Airports established in 1998
Airports in Turkey
Buildings and structures in Samsun Province
Transport in Samsun Province